Farlowella taphorni is a species of armored catfish endemic to Venezuela where it is found in the Torondoy River basin in the Lake Maracaibo drainage.  This species grows to a length of  SL.

References
 

taphorni
Fish of Venezuela
Endemic fauna of Venezuela
Fish described in 1997
Taxa named by Lawrence M. Page